Philip Rabner Sellinger (born 1954) is an American lawyer serving as the United States attorney for the District of New Jersey.

Early life and education 

Sellinger was born in Boston. He earned a Bachelor of Arts degree from the University of Massachusetts Amherst in 1976 and a Juris Doctor from the New York University School of Law in 1979.

Career 

In 1979 and 1980, Sellinger served as a law clerk for Judge Anne Elise Thompson. From 1981 to 1984, he served as an Assistant United States Attorney in the United States Attorney's Office for the District of New Jersey. From 1984 to 2002, he worked at Sills Cummis & Gross. In 2002, he became a co-managing partner of Greenberg Traurig. Sellinger has been a member of the New Jersey Democratic State Committee for Morris County. Sellinger has also been a political fundraiser for several New Jersey Democratic politicians, including Bob Menendez and Cory Booker.

U.S. attorney for the District of New Jersey 

On October 27, 2021, President Joe Biden announced Sellinger as a nominee to be the United States attorney for the District of New Jersey. On December 2, 2021, his nomination was reported out of committee by a voice vote. On December 7, 2021, his nomination was confirmed in the United States Senate. He was sworn into office on December 16, 2021.

Personal life 

Sellinger and his wife, Barbara, reside in Morris Township, New Jersey, in a mansion named Sunnymede.

References

External links

1954 births
Living people
20th-century American lawyers
21st-century American lawyers
Assistant United States Attorneys
Lawyers from Boston
New Jersey Democrats
New Jersey lawyers
New York University School of Law alumni
People from Morris Township, New Jersey
United States Attorneys for the District of New Jersey
University of Massachusetts Amherst alumni